Eldorado National Forest is a U.S. National Forest located in the central Sierra Nevada mountain range, in eastern California.

Geography

Most of the forest (72.8%) lies in El Dorado County. The forest is bordered on the north by the Tahoe National Forest, on the east by the Lake Tahoe Basin Management Unit, on the southeast by the Humboldt–Toiyabe National Forest, and to the south by the Stanislaus National Forest.

Eldorado National Forest headquarters are located in Placerville, California. There are local ranger district offices in Camino, Georgetown, Pioneer, and Pollock Pines.

Land ownership
A complicated ownership pattern exists. The parcels of other ownership (private or other agency land) are mostly isolated and surrounded on all sides by government land. An opposite pattern occurs outside of the forest boundary, where several small scattered pieces of national forest lands are separated from the main body and surrounded by lands of other ownership.
 Gross area: 786,994 acres (3,185 km²)
 Other ownership: 190,270 acres (770 km²)
 Net area: 596,724 acres (2,415 km²)

Elevations
The mountainous topography is broken by the steep canyons of the Mokelumne, Cosumnes, American, and Rubicon rivers. Plateaus of generally moderate relief are located between these steep canyons.

Wilderness areas
The Desolation Wilderness is located within the forest's boundaries, as is most of the Mokelumne Wilderness (which extends into neighboring Stanislaus National Forest and Humboldt–Toiyabe National Forest).

Climate

A cool montane version of Mediterranean climate extends over most of the forest, with warm, dry summers and cold, wet winters.
 Annual precipitation:  on average.
 Precipitation falls mainly from October through April.
 Temperature range: 0 °F (-20 °C) in winter to 100 °F (38 °C) in the summer.
 Snow is present from December to May at elevations above 6,000 feet (1,800 m).

Ecology

Vegetation
A wide variety of hardwoods, conifers, shrubs, native grasses, and forbs are represented in the various Eldorado National Forest ecosystems.

The principal plant communities found here are: 
Interior chaparral
Oak woodlands
Lower Montane forest — indicator species: Pinus ponderosa, Pinus jeffreyi
Upper Montane forest — indicator species: Abies magnifica
Subalpine zone.

Old-growth forests  totaling  have been identified in the Eldorado National Forest, consisting of:
Sierra Nevada mixed conifer forests
Coast Douglas-fir (Pseudotsuga menziesii var. menziesii)
Ponderosa pine (Pinus ponderosa)
White fir (Abies concolor)
and
Lodgepole pine (Pinus contorta) forests
Red fir (Abies magnifica) forests

Logging
The major commercial forest species are white fir, red fir, ponderosa pine, Jeffrey pine, sugar pine, Douglas fir, and incense cedar.

Water
Water is a major resource of the Eldorado National Forest.
  of fishable streams in four major drainage systems: Middle Fork of the American River (including the Rubicon), South Fork of the American River, Cosumnes River, and North Fork of the Mokelumne River.
 297 lakes and reservoirs (including both public and private land), which total 11,994 acres (48.5 km²). 11 large reservoirs account for 9,000 acres (36 km²). The rest are mostly small, high mountain lakes.

Transportation
Roads under Forest Service jurisdiction total .

History
The forest was established on July 28, 1910, from a portion of Tahoe National Forest and other lands.

See also
List of plants of the Sierra Nevada (U.S.)
:Category:Fauna of the Sierra Nevada (United States)

References

External links 

Gorp.com: Eldorado National Forest

 
National Forests of California
National Forests of Nevada
Protected areas of the Sierra Nevada (United States)
Protected areas of El Dorado County, California
Protected areas of Alpine County, California
Protected areas of Amador County, California
Protected areas of Placer County, California
Protected areas of Douglas County, Nevada